Ophonus heinzi is a species of ground beetle in the subfamily Harpalinae, genus Ophonus, and subgenus Ophonus (Ophonus).

References

heinzi
Beetles described in 1991